Ambush at Tomahawk Gap is a 1953 American Western film directed by Fred F. Sears and produced by Wallace MacDonald. It stars John Hodiak, John Derek, David Brian, and María Elena Marqués.

Plot
Four outlaws have just been released from Yuma Territorial Prison. They return to Tomahawk Gap, now a ghost town, to retrieve the money that they stole and was buried by a partner somewhere in the town. While hunting, the Indians attack, and a life and death battle ensues.

Cast
 John Hodiak as McCord
 David Brian as  Egan
 John Derek as Kid
 Ray Teal as Doc
 María Elena Marqués as Navaho girl
 John Qualen as Jonas P. Travis
 Otto Hulett as  Stranton
 Trevor Bardette as sheriff of Twin Forks
 Percy Helton as  Marlowe
 Harry Cording as Ostler
 John Doucette as Burt
 John War Eagle as Indian Chief

References

External links
 

1953 films
American romance films
American western films
Films directed by Fred F. Sears
Columbia Pictures films
1953 Western (genre) films
Films set in Arizona
1950s English-language films
1950s American films